Vermont wine refers to wine made from grapes grown in the U.S. state of Vermont. The first commercial winery in Vermont, Snow Farm Winery, opened in 1997.  Vermont is a very cold climate for viticulture.  Vermont wineries have focused on using cold-hardy French hybrid grapes, but have been experimenting with some Vitis vinifera varieties.  Some Vermont wineries produce wine made from grapes grown in other states, especially New York.

Vermont is a center for natural wine and biodynamic wine production.

See also

 American wine
 List of wineries in New England

References

External links
Vermont Grape & Wine Council
  TTB AVA Map

Wine regions of the United States by state
Tourism in Vermont
Agriculture in Vermont